Kim Chang-Hee (born 8 June 1987) is a South Korean football player who plays as a midfielder.

Club career

Kim spent his formative football years playing at university level for Yeungnam University.  Nominating himself for the 2010 K-League draft, he wasn't selected by any K-League clubs. However, Kim joined Gangwon FC late in the preseason.  His first K-League match was against Chunnam Dragons in Gangneung on 28 March 2010, resulting in a handy win 5 -2 for his club. Despite starting a number of matches for Gangwon in the first half of the season, he gradually fell out of favour and was eventually released by the club in January 2011. Chang subsequently dropped down to the next tier of Korean football, the Korea National League, with a move to Gangneung City FC.

Club career statistics

International career
Kim was a member of the South Korea national under-20 football team in the Niigata International Youth Friendly Tournament. He played two games in this tournament, but only one of these constituted a full youth international match.

References

External links
 K-League Player Record 

1987 births
Living people
Association football midfielders
South Korean footballers
Gangwon FC players
Gangneung City FC players
K League 1 players
Korea National League players
Yeungnam University alumni